PTTC may refer to:

PTTC (Siem Reap, Cambodia), the Provincial Teacher Training College
Philippine Trade Training Center, an agency of the Philippine Government
Public Transport Ticketing Corporation, an Australian government agency created to oversee the introduction of the Tcard